Naresh Kumar Shad (1927  1969) (Urdu: نریش کُمار شاد ) (Hindi: नरेश कुमार शाद ) was a ghazal, qat'aa and rubai writer.

Biography
Naresh Kumar Shad was born in Ahiyapur, Urmar Tanda, District Hoshiarpur on 11 December 1927.  His father Nauhariya Ram Dard Nakodari was a prominent and well known Urdu journalist and poet writer very famous back in those days. Having born to a Bhalla family of Nakodar a small Kasba type of a town in Jallandhar, he inherited fluent use of Urdu and Persian from his father. Naresh Kumar Shad did his high school from Govt. High School Chunian. His wife name was Varsha Shad and couple had son, Rakesh Shad. Kartik and Akash Shad are their grand children. He got Government job and was posted at Rawalpindi and later on transferred to Jallandhar. He was only 22 years old when his first poetry collection  book named Dastak was published by a small publisher in Jallandhar in August 1950. Earlier on he used to write under the pen-name of Shad Nakodari, Nakodar being his hometown but later on as he explained in his book named Wijdan in 1966, he chose not to use his hometown in pen-name and chose Shad as his pen-name. His first book named Dastak was very popular in Urdu shayari circles and Shad got instant shot at popularity with its success. By far, his only close rival from Punjab was Sahir Ludhianvi.

Literary career

Naresh Kumar Shad was a disciple of Labhu Ram Josh Malsiyani (1883-1976) who was a disciple of Nawab Mirza Daagh Dehalvi. He wrote ghazals which had become very popular even when he was alive  but his forte was Qat'aa and Rubai. His two collections of poetry, Qashen and Kalaam e Muntakhab were published during his lifetime. After his demise Naresh Kumar Shad Memorial Committee in the year 1970 published Shad Namah that contained his poems and articles appraising his literary output. Later on, Shad ki Shayari  Shad aur Akhtar ki shayari  and Adabi latife  came to light.

Bibliography
 Lalkar
 Dastak
 Qashen
 Wijdan
 Shad Namah
 Shad aur uski Shayari

References

Urdu-language poets from India
1927 births
1969 deaths
Hindu poets
Alcohol-related deaths in India
20th-century Indian poets
Indian male poets
20th-century Indian male writers